The wafer trapdoor spiders, family Cyrtaucheniidae, are a widespread family of spiders that lack the thorn-like spines on tarsi and metatarsi I and II (the two outermost leg segments) found in true trapdoor spiders (Ctenizidae).

Etymology
The scientific family name derives from the Greek κυρταύχην, kyrtaúchēn, which in turn is derived from Greek κυρτός kyrtós, meaning "curved", "arched" or "bent", αὐχήν auchen, meaning the cervix or neck, and the suffix -idae, which designates belonging to a family.

Biology
Many, but not all, make wafer-like doors to their burrows, while others build the cork-like doors found commonly in the true trapdoor spiders. The biology of nearly all the species is poorly known.

The monotypic Angka hexops has only six eyes, with the posterior median eyes missing. It is up to 15 mm long in both sexes.

Distribution
The family is well represented South America, and Africa. The genus Anemesia is found only in Central Asia, and Cyrtauchenius reaches from Algeria north to Italy, with one species found in the USA. Angka is endemic to the cloud forest of Doi Inthanon, Thailand.

Genera

The former subfamily Euctenizinae from the US and Mexico were promoted to family rank as Euctenizidae in 2012, and are now considered more closely related to Idiopidae. Further changes to the circumscription of the family were made in 2020. , the World Spider Catalog accepted the following genera:

Acontius Karsch, 1879 — Africa, Argentina
Ancylotrypa Simon, 1889 — Africa
Anemesia Pocock, 1895 — Asia
Bolostromoides Schiapelli & Gerschman, 1945 — Venezuela
Bolostromus Ausserer, 1875 — South America, Caribbean, Panama, Uganda
Cyrtauchenius Thorell, 1869 — Algeria, United States
Fufius Simon, 1888 — South America, Trinidad
Rhytidicolus Simon, 1889 — Venezuela

Genera formerly placed in the family include:
Amblyocarenum Simon, 1892 → Nemesiidae
Angka Raven & Schwendinger, 1995 → Microstigmatidae
Homostola Simon, 1892 → Bemmeridae

See also
 List of Cyrtaucheniidae species
 Spider families

Footnotes

References
 Raven, Robert J. (1985). "The spider Infraorder Mygalomorphae (Araneae): cladistics and systematics". Bulletin of the American Museum of Natural History 182: 1–180.
 Platnick, Norman I. (2008). "The world spider catalog, version 8.5". American Museum of Natural History.

 

Cyrtaucheniidae
Mygalomorphae families